Jesse Albanie (born 6 August 1999) is a South African cricketer. He made his List A debut on 3 November 2019, for North West in the 2019–20 CSA Provincial One-Day Challenge. He made his first-class debut on 25 November 2021, for North West in the 2021–22 CSA 4-Day Series.

References

External links
 

1999 births
Living people
South African cricketers
North West cricketers